Gerdeh is a rice cultivar being cultivated in Iran. This cultivar named Gerdeh because of its short and spheroid seed in contrast to other Iranian cultivars. Gerdeh means roundish or sphery in Persian. Presumably, this cultivar originated in Tarom, a town in Zanjan State of Iran. This cultivar is considered as a landrace.

References 

 

Rice varieties
Landraces